Bangladesh Tea Research Institute (BTRI) is an autonomous organisation under the Bangladesh Tea Board (BTB).

Background
The Pakistan Tea Board, in 1957 established a tea research station in East Pakistan. After the Independence of Bangladesh the station was upgraded to a research institute by the government of Bangladesh in 1973.

References

Government agencies of Bangladesh
1973 establishments in Bangladesh
Agriculture research institutes in Bangladesh
Agricultural organisations based in Bangladesh
Tea industry in Bangladesh
Srimangal Upazila